Alexandra Chasin (born 1961) is an American experimental writer based in Brooklyn, New York. She is also an associate professor of literary studies at The Eugene Lang College, The New School for Liberal Arts.

Biography
Chasin was born in 1961, in Boston, Massachusetts. She attended Brandeis University in Waltham, Massachusetts, where she received her bachelor's degree in European Cultural Studies in 1984. In 1993, Chasin earned her Ph.D in Modern Thoughts and Literature from Stanford University. She received her master's degree in fiction writing, in 2002, from Vermont College of Fine Arts.

Chasin joined Boston College in 1993 where she served as assistant professor for six years.  She taught American Studies and Women's Studies in the English Department at Boston College. In 1999, she was appointed as a visiting faculty in English at the University of Geneva. Chasin served as an instructor at Columbia University for one year from 2005 to 2006 where she taught Feminist theory as well as literary and cultural studies. She joined Lang College in 2006 where she is currently working as an associate professor in literary studies.

Works
Chasin has published several books of fiction and non-fiction. Her first book Selling Out: The Gay and Lesbian Movement Goes to Market was published in the year 2000 by St. Martin's Press. The book focuses on the gains and losses that have been attained by marketing of LGBT community. Chasin published her second book, Kissed By in 2007. The book was published by University of Alabama Press. In 2012, her third book Brief was published which also debuted as an app for the iPad. Chasin's fourth book, Assassin of Youth: A Kaleidoscopic History of Harry J. Anslinger's War on Drugs was published in the year 2016 by University of Chicago Press. The book tracks the cultural currents that produced prohibitionist drug policy in the U.S.

Chasin's writing has appeared in several print media such as Unsaid, Post Road, AGNI, Denver Quarterly and Chain. She has also written for online magazines including Exquisite Corpse, elimae, Diagram and Big Other. The film, Composer and I, was adapted from the original story written by Chasin. The film premiered at the Athens Film Festival in April 2012.

Chasin is an artistic director of Writing On It All, a public participatory writing project.

Fellowships
 Leon Levy Center for Biology at City University of New York (2013)
 New York Foundation for the Arts - fiction  (2012)

References

Living people
1961 births
20th-century American women writers
20th-century American writers
21st-century American women writers
People from Boston
Stanford University alumni
Brandeis University alumni
Vermont College of Fine Arts alumni
Boston College faculty
Columbia University faculty
Eugene Lang College The New School for Liberal Arts faculty